Jude Nancy (born 12 June 1984) is a Seychelles football player who plays for Saint Louis Suns United FC. He was a squad member for the 2019 COSAFA Cup and the 2019 Indian Ocean Island Games.

References 

1984 births
Living people
Seychellois footballers
Saint Louis Suns United FC players
The Lions FC players
Seychelles international footballers
Association football defenders